Jeroo is a cross-platform educational tool for learning object oriented programming concepts. In particular, the program helps learning concepts such as objects, methods and basic control structures.  Jeroo supports three syntactic styles: Java/C#/Javascript, Python, and Visual Basic.

The program features a GUI split in two sub-windows. In the first sub-window, the user can type code to be executed in the Jeroo environment. In the second sub-window, the user can see the effects of their code in a graphical environment. The second sub-window shows an island populated by Jeroos. The user can instruct the Jeroos, via programming in the first sub-window, to accomplish various actions such as moving, eating or picking up flowers.

The tool received a NEEDS "Premier Award Winner Associate Editor's Choice" in 2004.

Jeroo uses many different methods to engage its students such as storytelling and animating execution. The program has been looked at as a very useful and efficient tool to develop experience and knowledge in Computer Programming. There have also been many Computer Science competitions involving the Jeroo program and its features.

Commands
A Jeroo can do a few of things such as:

Contributors

Web-Based Jeroo (2019-Present) 

 Ben Konz
 Caelan Bryan
 Thomas Connole
 John Adam
 Brian Dorn

Stand-Alone Jeroo (2002-2019) 

 Brian Dorn
 Dean Sanders

Artwork Used in Both Web-Based Jeroo and Stand-Alone Jeroo 

 Christina Shell

See also
 Language Summary
 List of educational programming languages

References

External links
Jeroo official home page
Jeroo: A Tool For Introducing Object-Oriented Programming

Object-oriented programming